Tom Payne (4 October 1914 – 15 September 1996) was a Brazilian film director, screenwriter and actor, known for The Landowner's Daughter (1955), Payne and Hilliard (1931) and Curucu, Beast of the Amazon (1956). He was married to Eliane Lage. He died on 15 September 1996 in Alfenas, Minas Gerais, Brazil. His film Sinhá Moça was entered into the 4th Berlin International Film Festival.

Filmography

As Director
 Caiçara (1950)
 Ângela (1951)
 Terra É Sempre Terra (1952)
 Sai da Frente (1952)
 Sinhá Moça (1953)
 Arara Vermelha (1957)

As Actor
 No Hiding Place (1963)(TV Series) 3 episodes
 Ghost Squad (1963) (TV Series) 
 Z Cars (TV Series) Undetermined role
 Found Abandoned (1962) ... Undetermined role (uncredited)
 Soldier, Soldier (1961) (TV Movie) 
 Sykes and A... (1961) (TV Series) - Sykes and a Movie Camera 
 The Larkins (1958) (TV Series) 
 Arara Vermelha (1957)
 Love Slaves of the Amazons (1957) Dr. Mario Dellamano
 Curucu, Beast of the Amazon (1956) Tupanico
 Call Back Yesterday (TV Movie) (1956) Stage doorkeeper
 The Landowner's Daughter (1955)
 Caiçara (uncredited) (1950)
 Sinfonia fatale (1946)
 We're Going to Be Rich (1938) Kinch
 The Show Goes On (1937) Professor Augustino
 Feather Your Nest (1937) Fortner
 Keep Your Seats, Please! (1936) Man from Child Welfare
 Queen of Hearts (1936) Doorkeeper (uncredited)
 Maria Marten, or The Murder in the Red Barn (1936) Jailer (uncredited)
 Payne and Hilliard (1931) (Short)

References

External links

1914 births
1996 deaths
Brazilian film directors
Brazilian screenwriters
Brazilian male film actors
20th-century Brazilian male actors
20th-century screenwriters